Portieria hornemannii is a species of red algae in the family Rhizophyllidaceae. The chemical halomon was discovered in this species.

References

External links
Portieria hornemannii at AlgaeBase

Rhizophyllidaceae
Species described in 1819